Hirohi is a Japanese given name. It can also serve as a foreshortening of other names, including Hirohide, Hirohiko, Hirohisa, and Hirohito.

References